The 2014 Stockholm Ladies Curling Cup was held from September 26 to 28 at the Danderyd Curling Arena in Stockholm, Sweden as part of the 2014–15 World Curling Tour. The event was held in a round robin format, and the purse for the event was 250,000 SEK, of which the winner will receive 100,000 SEK.

The Margaretha Sigfridsson rink from Skellefteå won their first Stockholm Ladies Curling Cup, defeating Canada's Rachel Homan rink in the final, 6-3, after the Homan rink conceded after 7 ends. The defending Olympic champion Jennifer Jones rink, also from Canada, finished third.

Teams
The teams are listed as follows:

Round-robin standings

Playoffs

References

External links

Stockholm Ladies Cup
2014 in Swedish women's sport
2014 in women's curling
2010s in Stockholm
September 2014 sports events in Europe